Workplace incivility has been defined as low-intensity deviant behavior with ambiguous intent to harm the target. Uncivil behaviors are characteristically rude and discourteous, displaying a lack of regard for others. The authors hypothesize there is an "incivility spiral" in the workplace made worse by "asymmetric global interaction".

Incivility is distinct from aggression. The reduction of workplace incivility is an area for ongoing industrial and organizational psychology research.

Surveys on occurrence and effects 
A summary of research conducted in Europe suggests that workplace incivility is common there. In research on more than 1000 U.S. civil service workers, Cortina, Magley, Williams, and Langhout (2001) found that more than 70% of the sample experienced workplace incivility in the past five years. Similarly, Laschinger, Leiter, Day, and Gilin found that among 612 staff nurses, 67.5% had experienced incivility from their supervisors and 77.6% had experienced incivility from their coworkers. In addition, they found that low levels of incivility along with low levels of burnout and an empowering work environment were significant predictors of nurses' experiences of job satisfaction and organizational commitment. Incivility was associated with occupational stress and reduced job satisfaction. Other research shows that workplace incivility relates to job stress, depression, and life satisfaction as well.

After conducting more than six hundred interviews with "employees, managers, and professionals in varying industries across the United States" and collecting "survey data from an additional sample of more than 1,200 employees, managers, and professionals representing all industrial categories in the United States and Canada", Pearson and Porath wrote in 2004 that "The grand conclusion: incivility does matter. Whether its costs are borne by targets, their colleagues, their organizations, their families, their friends outside work, their customers, witnesses to the interactions, or even the instigators themselves, there is a price to be paid for uncivil encounters among coworkers." Citing previous research (2000) Pearson writes that "more than half the targets waste work time worrying about the incident or planning how to deal with or avert future interactions with the instigator. Nearly 40 percent reduced their commitment to the organization; 20 percent told us that they reduced their work effort intentionally as a result of the incivility, and 10 percent of targets said that they deliberately cut back the amount of time they spent at work."

Studies suggest that social support can buffer the negative effects of workplace incivility. Individuals who felt emotionally and organizationally socially supported reported fewer negative consequences (less depression and job stress, and higher in job and life satisfaction) of workplace incivility compared to those who felt less supported. Research also suggests that the negative effects of incivility can be offset by feelings of organizational trust and high regard for one's workgroup.

Subtle/covert examples

Examples at the more subtle end of the spectrum include:
 asking for input and then ignoring it
 "forgetting" to share credit for a collaborative work
 giving someone a "dirty look"
 interrupting others
 not listening
 side conversations during a formal business meeting/presentation
 speaking with a condescending tone
 waiting impatiently over someone's desk to gain their attention

Overt examples
Somewhere between the extremes are numerous everyday examples of workplace rudeness and impropriety including:

 disrespecting workers by comments, gestures or proven behaviors (hostility) based on characteristics such as their race, religion, gender, etc. This is considered workplace discrimination.
 disrupting meetings
 emotional put-downs
 giving dirty looks or other negative eye contact (i.e. "hawk eyes" considered to be threatening in the culture of the United States)
 giving public reprimands
 giving the silent treatment
 insulting others
 making accusations about professional competence
 not giving credit where credit is due
 overruling decisions without giving a reason
 sending a nasty and demeaning note (hate mail)
 talking about someone behind his or her back
 undermining credibility in front of others

Other overt forms of incivility might include emotional tirades and losing one's temper.

Corporate symptoms of long term incivility
Higher than normal employee turnover.
A large number of employee grievances and complaints.
Lost work time by employees calling in sick.
Increased consumer complaints.
Diminished productivity in terms of quality and quantity of work.
Cultural and communications barriers.
Lack of confidence in leadership.
Inability to adapt effectively to change.
Lack of individual accountability.
Lack of respect.

Predicting

Gender 
A number of studies have shown that women are more likely than men to experience workplace incivility and its associated negative outcomes. Research also shows that employees who witness incivility directed toward female coworkers have lower psychological wellbeing, physical health, and job satisfaction, which in turn relates lowered commitment toward the organization and higher job burnout and turnover intentions. Miner-Rubino and Cortina (2004) found that observing incivility toward women related to increased work withdrawal for both male and female employees, especially in work contexts where there were more men.

Other research shows that incivility directed toward same-gender coworkers tends to lead to more negative emotionality for observers. While both men and women felt anger, fear, and anxiety arising from same-gender incivility, women additionally reported higher levels of demoralization after witnessing such mistreatment. Furthermore, the negative effects of same-gender incivility were more pronounced for men observing men mistreating other men than for women observing women mistreating other women. Miner and Eischeid (2012) suggest this disparity reflects men perceiving uncivil behavior as a “clear affront to the power and status they have learned to expect for their group in interpersonal interactions.”

Motherhood status has also been examined as a possible predictor of being targeted for incivility in the workplace. This research shows that mothers with three or more children report more incivility than women with two, one, or zero children. Fathers, on the other hand, report more incivility than men without children, but still less than mothers.  While motherhood appears to predict increases in workplace incivility, results also showed that the negative outcomes associated with incivility were mitigated by motherhood status.  Fatherhood status, on the other hand, did not mitigate the relationship between incivility and outcomes.  Childless women reported more workplace incivility than childless men, and showed a stronger relationship between incivility and negative outcomes than childless men, mothers, and fathers.

Cortina (2008) conceptualizes incivility that amounts to covert practices of sexism and/or racism in the workplace as selective incivility. For example, Ozturk and Berber (2022) demonstrate significant evidence of subtle racism in UK workplaces, where racialized professionals appear to be the main targets of selective incivility.

Related notions

Workplace bullying 

Workplace bullying overlaps to some degree with workplace incivility but tends to encompass more intense and typically repeated acts of disregard and rudeness. Negative spirals of increasing incivility between organizational members can result in bullying, but isolated acts of incivility are not conceptually bullying despite the apparent similarity in their form and content. In case of bullying, the intent of harm is less ambiguous, an unequal balance of power (both formal and informal) is more salient, and the target of bullying feels threatened, vulnerable and unable to defend himself or herself against negative recurring actions.

Petty authority 

Another related notion is petty tyranny, which also involves a lack of consideration towards others, although petty tyranny is more narrowly defined as a profile of leaders and can also involve more severe forms of abuse of power and of authority.

See also

References

Further reading

Dissertations

Academic papers
 
 
 
 
 Dion MJ The impact of workplace incivility and occupational stress on the job satisfaction and turnover intention of acute care nurses – April 2006
 
 
 
 
 Hornstein HA Workplace incivility: An unavoidable product of human nature and organizational nurturing – Ivey Business Journal, November/December 2003
 Hutton SA Longitudinal Study of Workplace Incivility in a Hospital – University of Cincinnati 2008
 
 
 Kain VJJM The Relationship between workplace incivility and strain: Equity sensitivity as a moderator – Bowling Green State University 2008
 
 Lewis PS Workplace Incivility: Results of a Pilot Study 2009
 Lim VKG, Chin JY Cyber Incivility at the Workplace: What has Supervisor's Sex got to do with It? – PACIS 2006 Proceedings, 2006
 
 Linvill JS Surviving workplace incivility: The use of supportive networks as a coping strategy – Purdue University, 2008
 
 
 Namie G Workplace bullying: Escalated incivility – Ivey Business Journal, 2003
 
 
 
 Roberts SJ Incivility as a function of workplace favoritism and employee impulsivity – University of Nebraska at Omaha 2009
 Shim JH, Park S Concept exploration of workplace incivility: Its Implication to HRD – University of Minnesota
 Simmons DC Organizational culture, workplace incivility, and turnover: The impact of human resources practices – University of Louisville 2008
 Taylor SG Cold Looks and Hot Tempers: Individual-Level Effects of Incivility in the Workplace 2010
 Trudel J Workplace incivility: Relationship with conflict management styles and impact on perceived job performance, organizational commitment and turnover – University of Louisville 2009
 Vickers MH Writing what's relevant: workplace incivility in public administration-a wolf in sheep's clothing – Administrative Theory & Praxis, March 1, 2006
 Yang LQ, Spector PE, Zhang XC, Lin XH Occupational Stress among Chinese Service Workers: The Role of Workplace Incivility
 Zauderer DG Workplace incivility and the management of human capital – The Public Manager, Spring 2002

Etiquette
Workplace
Workplace bullying